The 2009–10 College Hockey America women's ice hockey season marked the continuation of the annual tradition of competitive ice hockey among College Hockey America members.

Preseason

College Hockey America Preseason Coaches’ Poll

Pre-Season All-CHA Team

 Player of the Year, Jesse Scanzano, Mercyhurst College

CIS Exhibition

Canadian semipro exhibition

Regular season

Standings

October
 October 31: No. 1 ranked Mercyhurst College suffered its first loss of the season. Fifth-ranked Minnesota Duluth skated away to a 4–3 win and a split of the two-game series at the Mercyhurst Ice Center. With the loss, the Lakers fall to 7–1 on the season.

November
 November 13: On Nov. 14, the Niagara Purple Eagles will don pink jerseys in an effort to help Pink the Rink in the annual CHA's initiative Skate for the Cure game for breast health awareness.

December
 December 6: The Robert Morris vs. Mercyhurst game on Sunday, December 6 at 1:00 p.m. has been postponed due to a water main break at the Mercyhurst Ice Center. The game is rescheduled for Tuesday, February 2 at 7:00 p.m.
 December 12: Jesse Scanzano scored three goals in the third period to lead the top-ranked Mercyhurst College women's hockey team over No. 10 St. Lawrence, 6–2.
 December 17: Former Robert Morris Colonials goaltender Brianne McLaughlin was selected as one of three goalies to the 2010 U.S. Olympic Women's Ice Hockey Team. McLaughlin is the first-ever Colonial to compete in the Olympic Games.

January
 January 27: The Mercyhurst Lakers (19-1-3, 6-0-1 College Hockey America) head the USA TODAY/USA Hockey Magazine poll for the 14th week and are the unanimous choice with all 19 first-place votes for the eighth time. Their only loss came in an October home split with Minnesota-Duluth, which is ranked fourth this week.
 January 30: Wayne State University's women's hockey program officially celebrates its 10th Anniversary on January 30–31. At the City Sports Center, the 2009-10 Warriors (8-11-3, 4-4-0 CHA) will host the Syracuse Orange (13-12-1, 4-4-0 CHA) in a College Hockey America series.
 January 30: Niagara became only the second team all year, and the first in the CHA team to defeat Mercyhurst. The Purple Eagles defeated the Lakers 2–1. Jenni Bauer stopped 44 of 45 shots, including all 19 fired her way in the second period in what was a scoreless game until the 42nd minute. The victory was the first-ever for the Purple Eagles over a top-ranked team and their first over the Lakers since 2004. The result snapped Mercyhurst's nation-leading 16-game unbeaten streak and 26-game CHA unbeaten run.

February

March

2010 Olympics
The following former CHA players will represent their respective countries in Ice hockey at the 2010 Winter Olympics.

In season honors

Players of the week
Throughout the conference regular season, College Hockey America offices names a player of the week each Monday.

Defensive players of the week

Rookies of the week
Throughout the conference regular season, College Hockey America offices names a rookie of the week each Monday.

Statistical leaders

Skaters
 As of February 10

Goaltenders
 As of February 10

Postseason

CHA tournament

CHA All-Tournament Team
 Forwards
 Bailey Bram (Mercyhurst)
 Lisa Mullan (Syracuse)
 Jesse Scanzano (Mercyhurst)
 Defense
 Melissa Lacroix (Mercyhurst)
 Gabrielle Beaudry (Syracuse)
 Goalie
 Lucy Schoedel (Syracuse)
 MVP: Ashley Cockell (Mercyhurst)

NCAA tournament

 It was announced on March 8 that Mercyhurst will be the No. 1 ranked team in the Frozen Four. The Lakers will host Boston University on Saturday, March 13 at 2:00 pm Eastern Time.

CHA Awards and honors

CHA all-academic honors
 Mercyhurst
 Vicki Bendus
 Pamela Zgoda

National awards and honors
 Vicki Bendus, Mercyhurst, Patty Kazmaier Award

See also
 National Collegiate Women's Ice Hockey Championship
 2009–10 NCAA Division I women's ice hockey season
 2009–10 Eastern College Athletic Conference women's ice hockey season
 2009–10 WCHA women's ice hockey season

References

External links 
 Official CHA Conference Site

College Hockey America
CHA